Transformers: Beast Wars is an American comic book ongoing series by IDW Publishing that debuted in 2021, written by Erik Burnham and drawn by Josh Burcham, celebrating the twentieth-fifth anniversary of the Beast Wars brand of the Transformers franchise by Hasbro.

The series debuted on February 3, 2021, and concluded on June 22, 2022, following the announcement of the Transformers comic book license leaving IDW by the end of the year.

Premise 
Set in a distant future of Cybertron, when the Predacons lead by Megatron steal a time machine, the Maximals lead by Optimus Primal must stop them from changing history.

Publication history

Background 
After Beast Machines finished airing in 2000, there was no official revisiting of the Transformers continuity established by the Beast Wars animated series until after publisher Dreamwave Productions acquired the rights to the Transformers comic franchise from Hasbro. Although the Transformers convention Botcon created several storylines external to the Beast Wars continuity (such as The Wreckers and a continuation of Beast Machines entitled Transformers: Universe) as various comic book miniseries, the canonicity of such stories is disputable. Dreamwave first touched on the Beast Wars series with a prequel in 2003's Transformers: More Than Meets The Eye. In 2004, the publisher's Transformers Summer Special featured Ain't No Rat, which was the first officially approved comic story to carry on directly from the events seen in the final Beast Wars cartoon. Dreamwave held a contest to select which Transformers continuity (Beast Wars or Robots in Disguise) would be the next to get its own book, and Beast Wars was the victor, with writers James McDonough and Adam Patyk and artist Don Figueroa as the initially planned creative team for the new series. However, despite several pieces of artwork being released (and according to those involved with the project some impressive pieces remaining unreleased), Dreamwave's bankruptcy caused the end of the series before it began. The story Dreamwave tried to produce will most likely remain lost, and it wasn't until 2006, when IDW began publishing Beast Wars: The Gathering, that the Beast Wars continuity was again officially revisited. With the second series, The Ascending, climaxing with Megatron's return to Cybertron, it seems that further Beast Wars stories seem unlikely. However, writer Simon Furman has not ruled out a return, noting that stories could have taken place during Megatron's takeover, before Optimus Primal and the Maximals returned.

Development 
In May 2020, IDW's then President Chris Ryall, and editor-in-chief John Barber, announced a new Beast Wars comic book in development.

In October 2020, IDW officially announced a new comic book series titled Transformers: Beast Wars, which will be written by Erik Burnham and drawn by Josh Burcham.

Burnham says that “Beast Wars was a wonderful and weird pivot from the Transformers setup to which I was first introduced. Big personalities, unexpected twists, and actual stakes all popped up regularly on the show, and those are tools that I enjoy using to build new stories. Best of all, the enthusiasm from everyone involved in this project has been so high that I'm feeling constantly inspired!”

Burcham says that "I'm so thrilled to be a part of this team. I was a ‘90s kid and even though I knew about Generation 1, Beast Wars was really my G1. It's still my favorite iteration, and I consider it such a privilege to be able to bring the characters to life in this brand new series. Let the Beast Wars rage on!"

IDW editor David Mariotte says that “Beast Wars is a beloved part of the Transformers legacy. That’s why we couldn’t pass up launching a new series in tandem with the 25th anniversary! Erik and Josh are going to take everything that’s beloved about Beast Wars — the characterization, the drama, the jokes — and start fresh with a series that will feel at home for fans of 25 years and first-timers alike.”

The series debuted on February 3, 2021, and concluded on June 22, 2022, following the announcement of IDW passing the Transformers comic book license by the end of the year.

Issues

Reception

Collected editions

Trade paperback

Other

See also 
 Transformers: Beast Wars (comics)

References 

IDW Publishing titles
Beast Wars
Comics 2021